The following songs were produced by Ski Beatz.

1990

Bizzie Boyz – Droppin' It 
01. For Those Who Slept 
02. Pump Up The House 
03. Too Deep For The Mortal Mind 
04. Droppin It 
05. Closa 
06. Hold The Lafta 
07. Say When 
08. If You Don't Want Me 
09. I Think I'm In Love 
10. Use Your Imagination 
11. Total Madness 
12. So Many Memories 
13. This Is How It Should Be Done 
14. Mission Accomplished 
15. Patty Porno 
16. Turntable Scientist

1992

Original Flavor – This Is How It Is 
01. This Is How It Is
02. When I Make It
03. Best Friend's Girl
04. Way Wit Words
05. Kick The Butta
06. Waitin' 4 My Break
07. Handle The Technique
08. Give 'Em Some Wrek
09. Gumdrops
10. I Like It (Freestyle)
11. Brain Storm
12. Swingin'
13. Here We Go

1994

Original Flavor – Beyond Flavor 
01. Intro
02. Can I Get Open
03. Beyond Flavor
04. Old School Skit
05. Watchawant
06. Stick It Where The Sun Don't Shine
07. Blowin' Up The Spot
08. Hit
09. Nigga Code
10. Many Styles
11. All That
12. Shut Up & Menage
13. Here We Go (Fuck It Up)
14. Keep On (Searching)
15. Shoutouts

1995

Jay-Z – In My Lifetime (VLS) 
01. In My Lifetime

AZ – Doe or Die 
11. Your World Don't Stop (produced with Spunk Biggs)

1996

Bahamadia – Kollage 
07. Uknowhowwedu (produced with DJ Redhanded)

Jay-Z – Reasonable Doubt 
02. Politics as Usual
04. Dead Presidents II
05. Feelin' It (feat. Mecca)
07. 22 Two's

Lil' Kim – Hard Core 
04. Spend a Little Doe

Young Zee – Musical Meltdown 
02. Don't Fuck with New Jersey
03. Problems
10. Juice (feat. Rah Digga)
14. Electric Chair (feat. D.U. & Pacewon)

1997

Camp Lo – Uptown Saturday Night 
01. Krystal Karrington
02. Luchini AKA This Is It
03. Park Joint
04. B-Side To Hollywood (feat. Trugoy the Dove)
05. Killin' Em Softly
06. Sparkle	Camp Lo
07. Black Connection
08. Swing (feat. Butterfly)
09. Rockin' It AKA Spanish Harlem
10. Say Word (feat. Jungle Brown)
11. Negro League (feat. Bones and Karachi R.A.W.)
12. Nicky Barnes AKA It's Alright (feat. Jungle Brown)
13. Black Nostaljack AKA Come On
14. Coolie High
15. Sparkle (Mr. Midnight Mix)

Jay-Z – In My Lifetime, Vol. 1 
05. Streets Is Watching
09. Who You Wit II

1998

Funkdoobiest – The Troubleshooters 
07. Oye Papi!

Lord Tariq and Peter Gunz – Make It Reign 
16. Cross Bronx Expressway (feat. Big Pun & Fat Joe)

Pacewon – I Declare War (VLS) 
A1. I Declare War (LP Version)
B1. Step Up (LP Version) (co-produced by Ken Sport)

Sporty Thievz – Street Cinema 
03. Fedz
04. Freeks
06. Like Father, Like Son
07. Raw Footage" (feat. Tragedy Khadafi)
09. Cheapskate (You Ain't Gettin' Nada)
10. Angel
15. Street Cinema

Fat Joe – Don Cartagena 
07. John Blaze (feat. Big Pun, Jadakiss, Nas & Raekwon)

2000

Nature – For All Seasons 
05. The Ultimate High (feat. Nas)

2001

Jay-Z – Jay-Z: Unplugged 
13. People Talking

2002

Camp Lo – Let's Do It Again 
01. Gotcha
02. Let's Do It Again
03. Glow
05. How U Walkin'
06. Black Connect II
07. Soul Train
08. Gorilla Pimp
09. China Soul
10. Macadame
11. Turbo Ozone
12. Carnival 4 Sha

Angie Martinez – Animal House 
10. Fucked Up Situation (feat. Tony Sunshine)

2005

Proof – Searching for Jerry Garcia 
14. Jump Biatch

2007

Camp Lo – Black Hollywood 

01. Posse from the Bronx
02. 82 Afros
03. Soul Fever
04. Pushahoe
05. Suga Willie's Revenge
06. Jack n' Jill
07. Material
08. Money Clap
09. Ganja Lounge
10. Black Hollywood
11. Zoom
12. Sweet Claudine

Pittsburgh Slim – Tastemaker 

01. Pittsburgh Slim
02. Superstar Extraordinaire
03. My Flashy World
04. Girls Kiss Girls
05. Sunrays
06. Kiss and Tell
07. Toy

2009

Willy Northpole – Tha Connect 
01. Intro (produced with Kevin "Khao" Kates)

Camp Lo – Another Heist 
01. Another Heist
02. Uptown
03. Satin Amnesia
06. Son of A
07. Good Green
08. Beautiful People
09. Bionic
10. Black Connect 3
11. I Love It Then
12. Uptown (Remix)

2010

The Cool Kids – Tacklebox (The Cool Kids Mixtape) 
07. Birthdays

Homeboy Sandman – The Good Sun 
04. Yeah But I Can Rhyme Though

Curren$y – Pilot Talk 
01. Example
02. Audio Dope II
03. King Kong
04. Seat Change (feat. Snoop Dogg)
05. Breakfast (produced with Mos Def)
07. Skybourne (feat. Big K.R.I.T. & Smoke DZA)
08. The Hangover (feat. Mikey Rocks)
09. The Day (feat. Jay Electronica & Mos Def)
11. Chilled Coughpee (feat. Devin the Dude)
12. Address (feat. Stalley)
13. Life Under the Scope (produced with Michael Sterling Eaton)

Ski Beatz – 24 Hour Karate School 
01. Nothing But Us (feat. Curren$y & Smoke DZA)
02. Go (feat. Jim Jones & Curren$y)
03. Prowler 2 (feat. Jean Grae, Jay Electronica & Joell Ortiz)
04. Do It Big!! (feat. The Cool Kids & Stalley)
05. S.T.A.L.L.E.Y. (feat. Stalley)
06. Not Like Me (feat. Tabi Bonney)
07. Scaling the Building (feat. Wiz Khalifa & Curren$y)
08. Super Bad (feat. Rugz D. Bewler)
09. I Got Mines (feat. Tabi Bonney, Nikki Wray, Ras Kass & Stalley)
10. Back Uptown (feat. Camp Lo)
11. Cream of the Planet (Instrumental)
12. Taxi (Instrumental)

Curren$y – Pilot Talk II 
01. Airborne Aquarium
02. Michael Knight
03. Montreux
05. Flight Briefing (feat. Young Roddy & Trademark Da Skydiver)
06. A Gee
07. Real Estates (feat. Dom Kennedy)
08. Silence (feat. McKenzie Eddy)
11. Highed Up
13. Michael Knight (Remix) (feat. Raekwon)

2011

Talib Kweli – Gutter Rainbows 
09. Cold Rain

Jet Life - Jet World Order 
14. Pre-Roasted

Dynasty Electric – Golden Arrows 
01. Golden Arrows
02. Radiation
03. Infectious
04. Bird Song
05. Spell of Time
06. And The Sky
07. Box of Light
08. Reality Check
09. Friends
10. Electro Retro
11. Mountain Song
12. Bird Song (One Drop)

Tabi Bonney – The Summer Years 
01. On Jupiter (feat. Itadi Bonney)
02. Parachute
03. Groupie Gridlock
04. Frontin
05. Feeling More (feat. Nicole Wray)
06. Beautiful Lover (feat. Terri Walker)
07. Hello & Goodnight
08. Winners Parade (feat. Nicole Wray)
09. Top Notch
10. Big Dreams
11. Hip Hop & Love (feat. Murs)
12. Chasing (Feat. Matt Beilis)

Murs – Love and Rockets Vol. 1: The Transformation 
01. Epic Salutations
02. Remember 2 Forget
03. 67 Cutlass
04. Eazy-E
05. Hip Hop and Love (feat. Tabi Bonney)
06. International
07. S-k-i-b-e-a-t-z (feat. Locksmith)
08. Westside Love
09. Life and Time (feat. Ab-Soul and O.C.)
10. Reach Hire
11. Dream on (feat. Dee-1)
12. 316 Ways
13. Animal Style

Locksmith – Embedded 
01. Intro (The Mirror)
02. Stokely Carmichael
03. Silly Negro
04. Devil's Lasso
05. Mr. Program Director
06. 100 Million Views
07. Look How I Shine (feat. Terri Walker)
08. Attention Whore
09. Games
10. The Bottom
11. Metabolic
12. Going Numb

2012

Ski Beatz – 24 Hour Karate School Presents Twilight 
01. Didit4thegreen (feat. Da$h & Retch)
02. Fly By (feat. Curren$y)
03. Heaven Is (feat. C Plus)
04. Gentlemen's Quarterly (feat. Stalley)
05. Living It Up (feat. Mikey Rocks & Trademark Da Skydiver)
06. Fly High (feat. Smoke DZA & Terri Walker)
07. Hip-Hop & Love (Feat. Tabi Bonney & Murs)
08. City Lights (Feat. Najee)
09. On (Feat. Sam Adams & Olamide Faison)
10. Time Goes (feat. Mac Miller)
11. Thank God (Feat. Rugz D. Bewler & Nicole Wray)

2014

Smoke DZA – Dream.ZONE.Achieve 
05. Jigga Flow (feat. NymLo)

2015

Curren$y – Pilot Talk III 
 02. Long as the Lord Say
 05. Get Down
 06. Sidewalk Show
 08. Audio Dope 5
 11. Search Party
 13. Briefcase
 15. Alert (ft. Styles P)

Mos Def & Ski Beatz 
 01. Sensei On The Block

2021

Fee the Evolutionist ft. Professor Lyrical & Ruby Shabazz (X-Caliber) 
 01. Back in the Dayz

Upcoming projects

Terri Walker – Walk with Me 

Production discographies